Texas Beach in Richmond, Virginia is a riverside area located south of Maymont and west of Hollywood Cemetery. The area is named Texas Beach after Texas Avenue in the Maymont neighborhood, which was the original street to reach the recreation area. Today, it served via the North Bank Trail. The area is home to numerous river beaches, a skatepark, and mountain bike trails.

See also 
 Neighborhoods of Richmond, Virginia
 Richmond, Virginia

References 

Neighborhoods in Richmond, Virginia